Naphthylaminopropane (PAL-287) is an experimental drug under investigation as of 2007 for the treatment of alcohol and stimulant addiction.

Naphthylisopropylamine acts as a non-neurotoxic releasing agent of serotonin, norepinephrine, and dopamine, with EC50 values of 3.4 nM, 11.1 nM, and 12.6 nM, respectively. It also has affinity for the 5-HT2A, 5-HT2B, and 5-HT2C receptors (EC50 values = 466 nM, 40 nM, and 2.3 nM, respectively), and acts as a full agonist at 5-HT2B and as a partial agonist at 5-HT2C, while its affinity for 5-HT2A is probably too low to be significant.

In animal studies, naphthylisopropylamine was shown to reduce cocaine self-administration, yet produced relatively weak stimulant effects when administered alone, being a (much) lesser stimulant than d-amphetamine for comparison. Further research is now being conducted in primates to see if it will be a useful substitute for treating drug addiction in humans as well.

An important observation is that in behavioral studies, rodents would consistently self-administer selective norepinephrine and dopamine releasing agents such as d-amphetamine, yet compounds that also release serotonin like naphthylisopropylamine would not be self-administered. In addition to the drugs (acute) effects on self-administration, all of the available evidence suggests that the locomotor activation caused by the majority of dopamine releasers is also dampened when the drugs also cause serotonergic release. In fact, PAL-287 causes no locomotor activation at all (although admittedly the tests were only after acute dosing).

The high affinity of PAL-287 for 5-HT2C receptors meant that it functioned as a reliable anorectant and was being considered for this indication (i.e. weight loss). However, there were ultimately some concerns raised over the compounds affinity for 5HT2B receptors, since some of the more serious side effects of the serotonin releasing weight loss drug fenfluramine were linked to an activation of this receptor. Apparently, more research will have to be done to assess if PAL-287 causes activation of the 5HT2A and 5HT2B receptors in vivo. However, according to the authors, even the relatively safe drug MDMA causes heart disease, and the incidence being reported for fenfluramine was not that great, even though the evidence being presented was indisputable. Thus it is relatively more likely that any of the more serious side effects from using PAL-287 will only occur in cases of overdose, and not when using a clinically responsible amount of the drug.

See also 
 5-APDI
 6-APT
 HDEP-28
 HDMP-28
 Naphyrone

References 

Amines
2-Naphthyl compounds
Serotonin receptor agonists
Serotonin-norepinephrine-dopamine releasing agents
Stimulants
Designer drugs
Entactogens and empathogens